The British Ambassador to the European Union is the United Kingdom's foremost diplomatic representative to the European Union, and head of the United Kingdom Mission to the European Union (UKMis). This role replaced that of Permanent Representative to the European Union (UKREP) when the United Kingdom left the European Union on 31 January 2020.

The UK Mission to the EU is located in the same building as the British Embassy to Belgium at 10 Avenue d’Auderghem in Brussels.

List of heads of mission

Ambassador to the European Union
2020–2021: Sir Tim Barrow

2021–: Lindsay Croisdale-Appleby (technically not yet installed as ambassador because of a diplomatic row between the EU and the UK)

References

External links 
UK Mission to the European Union, gov.uk

European Union
United Kingdom
 
United Kingdom and the European Union